Gillett School District is a school district based in Gillett, Wisconsin.

Schools
 Gillett High School
 Gillett Middle School
 Gillett Elementary School

References

External links
 Gillett School District
School districts in Wisconsin
Education in Oconto County, Wisconsin